The 2002 Saxony-Anhalt state election was held on 21 April 2002 to elect the members of the 4th Landtag of Saxony-Anhalt. The incumbent Social Democratic Party (SPD) minority government led by Minister-President Reinhard Höppner was defeated. The SPD fell to third place, while the Christian Democratic Union (CDU) moved into first. The CDU subsequently formed a coalition with the Free Democratic Party (FDP), and CDU leader Wolfgang Böhmer was elected Minister-President.

Background
After both the 1994 and 1998 state elections, the SPD formed a minority government with the external support of the Party of Democratic Socialism (PDS). This marked the first time the PDS had been involved in determining government in a German state, and was a unique arrangement, dubbed the "Magdeburg model" after the capital of Saxony-Anhalt. In Germany, governments are typically coalition governments, in which the parties which support the government take part in cabinet and hold a majority of seats between them. However, the SPD/PDS arrangement functioned on a model of "tolerance", in which the PDS remained outside cabinet and abstained from the vote for Minister-President, rather than voting in favour, allowing the SPD to form a minority government. In 1994, this allowed the investment of an SPD–Green minority government; in 1998, after the Greens lost their Landtag representation, the SPD governed alone.

Campaign and issues
At the time, Saxony-Anhalt was the "poorest" state of Germany, and that with the highest unemployment rate. The state election campaign was also influenced by the upcoming federal election.

The German People's Union, which won 12.9% of the vote and 12 seats in 1998, did not run in the election. This came after internal strife and the secession of the Freedom and Democracy People's Party (FDVP), which did run in the election.

Parties
The table below lists parties represented in the 3rd Landtag of Saxony-Anhalt.

Opinion polling

Election result

|-
! colspan="2" | Party
! Votes
! %
! +/-
! Seats 
! +/-
! Seats %
|-
| bgcolor=| 
| align=left | Christian Democratic Union (CDU)
| align=right| 433,521
| align=right| 37.3
| align=right| 15.3
| align=right| 48
| align=right| 20
| align=right| 41.7
|-
| bgcolor=| 
| align=left | Party of Democratic Socialism (PDS)
| align=right| 236,484
| align=right| 20.4
| align=right| 0.8
| align=right| 25
| align=right| 0
| align=right| 21.7
|-
| bgcolor=| 
| align=left | Social Democratic Party (SPD)
| align=right| 231,732
| align=right| 20.0
| align=right| 15.9
| align=right| 25
| align=right| 22
| align=right| 21.7
|-
| bgcolor=| 
| align=left | Free Democratic Party (FDP)
| align=right| 154,145
| align=right| 13.3
| align=right| 9.1
| align=right| 17
| align=right| 17
| align=right| 14.8
|-
! colspan=8|
|-
| bgcolor=#63B8FF|
| align=left | Party for a Rule of Law Offensive (Schill party)
| align=right| 52,589
| align=right| 4.5
| align=right| New
| align=right| 0
| align=right| New
| align=right| 0
|-
| bgcolor=| 
| align=left | Alliance 90/The Greens (Grüne)
| align=right| 22,696
| align=right| 2.0
| align=right| 1.2
| align=right| 0
| align=right| ±0
| align=right| 0
|-
| bgcolor=|
| align=left | Others
| align=right| 29,818
| align=right| 2.6
| align=right| 
| align=right| 0
| align=right| ±0
| align=right| 0
|-
! align=right colspan=2| Total
! align=right| 1,160,985
! align=right| 100.0
! align=right| 
! align=right| 115
! align=right| 1
! align=right| 
|-
! align=right colspan=2| Voter turnout
! align=right| 
! align=right| 56.5
! align=right| 15.0
! align=right| 
! align=right| 
! align=right| 
|}

Outcome
The SPD suffered a major defeat, falling to third place behind both the CDU and PDS. The CDU became the largest party with 37% of the vote. The FDP achieved an unexpected victory with 13% of the vote. The Party for a Rule of Law Offensive (Schill party) failed to win seats, despite polling suggesting they would narrowly enter the Landtag.

While polls before the election indicated the SPD and PDS would likely retain a slim majority, the success of the FDP at the SPD's expense meant that the CDU and FDP held a comfortable majority between them. Thus, the PDS-backed SPD government no longer had the numbers to retain power. The CDU and FDP negotiated a coalition, with CDU leader Wolfgang Böhmer heading the new government.

The election, which took place five months before the 2002 federal election, was a major defeat for the federal SPD–Green government, and weakened its standing in the Bundesrat.

Sources
 The Federal Returning Officer 

2002
2002 elections in Germany